Laurence Hardy (14 April 1854 – 21 January 1933) was a Conservative Party British politician. He was a Member of Parliament (MP) for Ashford from 1892 to 1918.

Hardy was the fourth son of Sir John Hardy, 1st Baronet, of Dunstall Hall, and was educated at Eton and Christ Church, Oxford.

References

1854 births
1933 deaths
19th-century British people
20th-century British people
UK MPs 1892–1895
UK MPs 1895–1900
UK MPs 1900–1906
UK MPs 1906–1910
UK MPs 1910
UK MPs 1910–1918
Conservative Party (UK) MPs for English constituencies
Members of the Privy Council of the United Kingdom
People educated at Eton College
Alumni of Christ Church, Oxford